Alfredo Napoleão dos Santos (31 January 1852, Porto – 20 November 1917, Lisbon) was a Portuguese pianist and composer. He was the youngest of three Napoleão siblings, the others being Arthur Napoleão (1843–1925), and Aníbal Napoleão (1845–1880).

Biography
Their parents were Portuguese, Alexandre Napoleão (a musician himself) and Joaquina Maria dos Santos. The latter died, when Alfredo was only a year old. The father worked in London, and Alfredo spent his childhood with his maternal grandmother in Porto, his birthplace. In 1858 he was brought to London to study with a certain Professor Wood. These studies continued up to 1868, when he went to Brazil, like his two brothers.

In 1869 he gave his debut recital in Rio de Janeiro, with great success. He made an extensive tour through the country and settled in Buenos Aires, and then in Montevideo, where he taught piano. In 1879 he was again in Rio de Janeiro and for some years toured the northern parts of Brazil. At that time he was at the height of his fame.

Returning to Portugal in 1882, he gave concerts in Lisbon and Porto, then London and Paris. In 1889 he went to Brazil again and made a tour through the entire continent. In 1891 he returned to Porto.

Alfredo Napoleão was a great interpreter of Bach, Beethoven and Schumann.

Compositions 
Alfredo Napoleão's compositions include four piano concertos, a Polonaise for piano and orchestra, an Ouverture symphonique for large orchestra, chamber music, piano sonatas and many piano pieces.

List of works (selective) 
For piano
Op.1 - Estrella d'Alva, Polka brilhante
Op.2 - Fantaisie sur Les bavards de J. Offenbach
Op.3 - Fantaisie de salon sur Le pont des soupirs, opera bouffe de J. Offenbach
Op.12 - Grande fantaisie de concert sur le Carnaval de Venise
Op.29 - Reminiscences de Aida de Verdi, Grande fantaisie
Op.36 - Tableaux, Suite de petites piéces caractéristiques (Porto: Costa Mesquita, ca.1882)
(Les Acrobates; Le Retour du Troubadour; Bonheur supréme; Danse Villageoise; Je t'en supplie; Marche des nobles)
Op.41 - Prelude and Fugue in F-sharp minor (London: Augener, ca.1888)
Op.54 - Trois romances (Un Soir de Printemps; Le Rêve; Exhaussée!)
Op.60 - Diva, Valse (Porto: Raymundo de Macedo, ca.1913)
 Se sa minga, opera de Carlos Gomes: Polka
For piano and orchestra
Op.27 - Andante et Polonaise de concert
Op.31 - Piano Concerto No. 2 in E-flat minor

Discography 
 (rec. 2013) Piano Concerto No. 2 – Artur Pizarro (piano), BBC National Orchestra of Wales, Martyn Brabbins (conductor) – Hyperion CDA67984

References 

1852 births
1917 deaths
Brazilian composers
Musicians from Porto
Brazilian pianists
19th-century Portuguese people
19th-century pianists